Abraham Hans Oort (born 1934 in Leiden, Netherlands) is a Dutch-born American climatologist. 

Oort is the son of the Dutch astronomer Jan Hendrik Oort. He moved to the United States in 1961. Since 1971, Oort was professor at Princeton University, where from 1977 until his retirement in 1996 he worked at the Geophysical Fluid Dynamics Laboratory/NOAA. Oort is best known for his textbook, Physics of Climate, written in conjunction with José P. Peixoto.

References

External links
Bibliography at GFDL
Oort's Monthly and Seasonal Global Circulation Statistics since 1958 from NCAR and LDEO/IRI Climate Data Library

1934 births
Living people
American climatologists
Dutch climatologists
Dutch emigrants to the United States
People from Leiden
Princeton University faculty
Utrecht University alumni